HMS Goshawk was an Acheron-class destroyer of the Royal Navy that served during World War I and was sold for breaking in 1921. She was the sixth Royal Navy ship to be named after the bird of prey, Accipiter gentilis.

Construction
She was built under the 1910-11 shipbuilding programme by William Beardmore & Company of Dalmuir and was launched on 18 October 1911. She was built to the standard Admiralty I-class design, with three Parsons steam turbines driving three shafts.

Pennant Numbers

Operational history

Action on 16 August 1914
On 16 August 1914, within days of the outbreak of war, the First Destroyer Flotilla engaged an enemy cruiser off the mouth of the Elbe, which is reported with great verve by an author writing under the pseudonym "Clinker Knocker" in 1938:

The Battle of Heligoland Bight
Goshawk took part on the Battle of Heligoland Bight on 28 August 1914, and in Commodore Tyrwhitt's despatch, her captain was singled out for praise:

The Battle of Dogger Bank
On 24 January 1915, the First Destroyer Flotilla, including Goshawk, were present at the Battle of Dogger Bank, led by the light cruiser Aurora.

Reassignment as submarine screen for battlecruisers
Early in 1915, the First Destroyer Flotilla was reassigned as a submarine screen for the Grand Fleet's battlecruisers. They moved from Harwich to the Firth of Forth on 17 March 1915.

The Battle of Jutland
Goshawk was present at the Battle of Jutland with the First Destroyer Flotilla, and her captain, Commander Dashwood Fowler Moir RN, was mentioned in despatches.

Mediterranean service
Goshawk was present at the entry of the Allied Fleet through the Dardanelles on 12 November 1918. The Fleet sighted the minarets of Constantinople at 07:00 on 13 November and anchored an hour later.  The destroyers maintained an anti-submarine patrol to the west of the anchored fleet.

Decommissioning and fate
In common with most of her class, she was laid up after World War I, and on 4 November 1921 she was sold to Rees of Llanelly for breaking.

References

External links 

 Battle of Jutland Crew Lists Project - HMS Goshawk Crew List

Acheron-class destroyers of the Royal Navy
Ships built on the River Clyde
1911 ships
World War I destroyers of the United Kingdom